Svartfjellet is the highest mountain on the island of Kvaløya in Troms og Finnmark county, Norway.

References

Kvalsund
Hammerfest
Mountains of Troms og Finnmark